The Lawrenceville Branch of the Carnegie Library of Pittsburgh, located at 279 Fisk Street in the Lawrenceville neighborhood of Pittsburgh, Pennsylvania, opened May 10, 1898.  It was originally commissioned as part of Andrew Carnegie's first grant to Pittsburgh and was the second library in the Pittsburgh city system to open, following the Main Branch.

It was the sixth Carnegie funded library to open in America and the very first to have the new revolutionary policy of open or self-service shelves. The first five libraries to open in America, as well as the seventh, Carnegie Library of Homestead, which opened 6 months after Lawrenceville, were originally closed stack libraries where a clerk was needed to fetch books for the patrons. The eighth to open in America, the West End Branch of the Carnegie Library of Pittsburgh, opened January 31, 1899, would also have open stacks.

The Lawrenceville Branch was also the first library to have a dedicated Children's room. It was designed by the architectural firm Alden & Harlow,  and it was added to the List of City of Pittsburgh historic designations on July 28, 2004, and the List of Pittsburgh History and Landmarks Foundation Historic Landmarks in 1988.

References

Library buildings completed in 1898
Libraries in Pittsburgh
Carnegie libraries in Pennsylvania
Lawrenceville (Pittsburgh)
1898 establishments in Pennsylvania